Gerd-e Kuh may refer to:
 Gerd-e Kuh, Lahijan
 Gerd-e Kuh, Siahkal